Tekeseleng is a community council located in the Mokhotlong District of Lesotho. Its population in 2006 was 4,397.

Villages
The community of Tekeseleng includes the villages of Boritsa, Ha Koenane, Ha Koeneho, Ha Mabina, Ha Maile, Ha Matsoejane, Ha Poho, Ha Setefane, Jemisetone, Lekhalong, Likoae, Linareng, Liparamiting, Liraoheleng, Makhapung, Malieketseng, Maputsoe, Masuoaneng, Matebeleng, Mathakheng, Matsoaing, Matsoijane, Thaba-Phatšoa, Tlapa-le-Putsoa and Tseko.

References

External links
 Google map of community villages

Populated places in Mokhotlong District